Lughnasadh or Lughnasa is an official Irish holiday and Gaelic festival marking the beginning of the harvest season. Historically, it was widely observed throughout Ireland, Scotland and the Isle of Man. Traditionally it is held on 1 August, or about halfway between the summer solstice and autumn equinox. In recent centuries some of the celebrations have been shifted to the Sunday nearest this date.

Lughnasadh is one of the four Gaelic seasonal festivals, along with Samhain, Imbolc and Beltane. It corresponds to other European harvest festivals such as the Welsh  and the English Lammas.

Lughnasadh is mentioned in some of the earliest Irish literature and has pagan origins. The festival itself is named after the god Lugh. It inspired great gatherings that included religious ceremonies, ritual athletic contests (most notably the Tailteann Games), feasting, matchmaking, and trading. Lughnasadh occurred during a very poor time of the year for the farming community when the old crops were done and the new ones not yet ready for harvest. Traditionally there were also visits to holy wells. According to folklorist Máire MacNeill, evidence shows that the religious rites included an offering of the First Fruits, a feast of the new food and of bilberries, the sacrifice of a bull, and a ritual dance-play in which Lugh seizes the harvest for mankind and defeats the powers of blight. Many of the activities would have taken place on top of hills and mountains.

Lughnasadh customs persisted widely until the 20th century, with the event being variously named 'Garland Sunday', 'Bilberry Sunday', 'Mountain Sunday' and 'Crom Dubh Sunday'. The custom of climbing hills and mountains at Lughnasadh has survived in some areas, although it has been re-cast as a Christian pilgrimage. The best known is the 'Reek Sunday' pilgrimage to the top of Croagh Patrick on the last Sunday in July. A number of fairs are also believed to be survivals of Lughnasadh, for example, the Puck Fair.

Since the late 20th century, Celtic neopagans have observed Lughnasadh, or something based on it, as a religious holiday. In some places, elements of the festival have been revived as a cultural event.

Name

In Modern Scottish Gaelic, the festival and the month are both called  . In Manx, the festival and the month are both called  .

Historic Lughnasadh customs

In Irish mythology, the Lughnasadh festival is said to have begun by the god Lugh as a funeral feast and athletic competition (see funeral games) in commemoration of his mother or foster-mother Tailtiu. She was said to have died of exhaustion after clearing the plains of Ireland for agriculture. Tailtiu may have been an earth goddess who represented the dying vegetation that fed mankind. According to medieval writings, kings attended this óenach and a truce was declared for its duration. It was similar to the Ancient Olympic Games and included ritual athletic and sporting contests, horse racing, music and storytelling, trading, proclaiming laws and settling legal disputes, drawing-up contracts, and matchmaking. At Tailtin, trial marriages were conducted, whereby young couples joined hands through a hole in a wooden door. The trial marriage lasted a year and a day, at which time the marriage could be made either permanent or broken without consequences.

Carman is also believed to have been a goddess, perhaps one with a similar tale as Tailtiu. The  included a food market, a livestock market, and a market for foreign traders. It was revived for a period in the 20th century as the Tailteann Games.

A 15th century version of the Irish legend Tochmarc Emire ("the Wooing of Emer") is one of the earliest documents to record these festivities.

From the 18th century to the mid 20th century many accounts of Lughnasadh customs and folklore were recorded. In 1962 The Festival of Lughnasa, a study of Lughnasadh by folklorist Máire MacNeill, was published. MacNeill studied surviving Lughnasadh customs and folklore as well as the earlier accounts and medieval writings about the festival. She concluded that the evidence testified to the existence of an ancient festival around 1 August that involved the following:

A solemn cutting of the first of the corn of which an offering would be made to the deity by bringing it up to a high place and burying it; a meal of the new food and of bilberries of which everyone must partake; a sacrifice of a sacred bull, a feast of its flesh, with some ceremony involving its hide, and its replacement by a young bull; a ritual dance-play perhaps telling of a struggle for a goddess and a ritual fight; an installation of a [carved stone] head on top of the hill and a triumphing over it by an actor impersonating Lugh; another play representing the confinement by Lugh of the monster blight or famine; a three-day celebration presided over by the brilliant young god [Lugh] or his human representative. Finally, a ceremony indicating that the interregnum was over, and the chief god in his right place again.

According to MacNeill, the main theme that emerges from the folklore and rituals of Lughnasadh is a struggle for the harvest between two gods. One god – usually called Crom Dubh – guards the grain as his treasure. The other god – Lugh – must seize it for mankind. Sometimes, this was portrayed as a struggle over a woman called Eithne, who represents the grain. Lugh also fights and defeats a figure representing blight. MacNeill says that these themes can be seen in earlier Irish mythology, particularly in the tale of Lugh defeating Balor, which seems to represent the overcoming of blight, drought and the scorching summer sun. In surviving folklore, Lugh is usually replaced by Saint Patrick, while Crom Dubh is a pagan chief who owns a granary or a bull and who opposes Patrick, but is overcome and converted. Crom Dubh is likely the same figure as Crom Cruach and shares some traits with the Dagda and Donn. He may be based on an underworld god like Hades and Pluto, who kidnaps the grain goddess Persephone but is forced to let her return to the world above before harvest time.

Many of the customs described by MacNeill and by medieval writers were being practised into the modern era, though they were either Christianized or shorn of any pagan religious meaning. Many of Ireland's prominent mountains and hills were climbed at Lughnasadh. Some of the treks were eventually re-cast as Christian pilgrimages, the most well-known being Reek Sunday—the yearly pilgrimage to the top of Croagh Patrick in late July. Other hilltop gatherings were secular and attended mostly by the youth. In Ireland, bilberries were gathered and there was eating, drinking, dancing, folk music, games and matchmaking, as well as athletic and sporting contests such as weight-throwing, hurling and horse racing. At some gatherings, everyone wore flowers while climbing the hill and then buried them at the summit as a sign that summer was ending. In other places, the first sheaf of the harvest was buried. There were also faction fights, whereby two groups of young men fought with sticks. In 18th-century Lothian, rival groups of young men built towers of sods topped with a flag. For days, each group tried to sabotage the other's tower, and at Lughnasadh they met each other in 'battle'. Bull sacrifices around Lughnasadh time were recorded as late as the 18th century at Cois Fharraige in Ireland (where they were offered to Crom Dubh) and at Loch Maree in Scotland (where they were offered to Saint Máel Ruba). Special meals were made with the first produce of the harvest.

Another custom that Lughnasadh shared with Imbolc and Beltane was visiting holy wells, some specifically clootie wells.  Visitors to these wells would pray for health while walking sunwise around the well; they would then leave offerings, typically coins or clooties. Although bonfires were lit at some of the open-air gatherings in Ireland, they were rare and incidental to the celebrations.

Traditionally, Lughnasadh has always been reckoned as the first day of August. In recent centuries, however, much of the gatherings and festivities associated with it shifted to the nearest Sundays – either the last Sunday in July or first Sunday in August. It is believed this is because the coming of the harvest was a busy time and the weather could be unpredictable, which meant work days were too important to give up. As Sunday would have been a day of rest anyway, it made sense to hold celebrations then. The festival may also have been affected by the shift to the Gregorian calendar.

Lughnasadh was a time of unpredictable weather in Ireland. Heavy rains known as "Lammas floods" often coincided with beginning of August and were responsible for destroying the corn. There are many folk sayings that relate to the unpredictable weather conditions during Lughnasadh and the importance of these conditions to the harvest:

"...For Lammas floods, with crops oft havoc play,

And e'en one swept the rustic bridge away."

"August needs the dew as much as men need bread."

"After Lammas corn ripens as much by night as by day."

Modern Lughnasadh customs
In Ireland some of the mountain pilgrimages have survived. By far the most popular is the Reek Sunday pilgrimage at Croagh Patrick, which attracts tens of thousands of pilgrims each year.

The Puck Fair is held each year in early August in the town of Killorglin, County Kerry. It has been traced as far back as the 16th century but is believed to be a survival of a Lughnasadh festival. At the beginning of the three-day festival, a wild goat is brought into the town and crowned 'king', while a local girl is crowned 'queen'. The festival includes traditional music and dancing, a parade, arts and crafts workshops, a horse and cattle fair, and a market. It draws a great number of tourists each year.

In recent years, other towns in Ireland have begun holding yearly Lughnasa Festivals and Lughnasa Fairs. Like the Puck Fair, these often include traditional music and dancing, arts and crafts workshops, traditional storytelling, and markets. Such festivals have been held in Gweedore, Sligo, Brandon, Rathangan and a number of other places. Craggaunowen, an open-air museum in County Clare, hosts a yearly Lughnasa Festival at which historical re-enactors demonstrate elements of daily life in Gaelic Ireland. It includes displays of replica clothing, artefacts, weapons and jewellery. A similar event has been held each year at Carrickfergus Castle in County Antrim. In 2011 RTÉ broadcast a Lughnasa Live television program from Craggaunowen.

In the Irish diaspora survivals of the Lughnasadh festivities are often seen by some families still choosing August as the traditional time for family reunions and parties, though due to modern work schedules these events have sometimes been moved to adjacent secular holidays, such as the Fourth of July in the United States.

The festival is referenced in the 1990 play Dancing at Lughnasa by Brian Friel, which was adapted into a 1998 film of the same name.

Neopaganism
Lughnasadh, or similar festivities based on it, is observed by some modern Pagans in general and Celtic Neopagans in particular. Despite their common name, such Lughnasadh celebrations can differ widely. While some attempt to emulate the historic festival as much as possible, others base their celebrations on many sources, the Gaelic festival being only one of them.

Neopagans usually celebrate Lughnasadh on 1 August in the Northern Hemisphere and 1 February in the Southern Hemisphere, often beginning their festivities at sunset the evening before. Some Neopagans celebrate it at the astronomical midpoint between the summer solstice and autumn equinox, or the full moon nearest this point. In 2022, this astronomical midpoint falls on 7 August (Northern hemisphere) or 4 February (Southern hemisphere).

Celtic Reconstructionist
Celtic Reconstructionist pagans strive for continuity with pre-Christian practices of the Celts, based on research and historical accounts, but may be modified slightly to suit modern life. Reconstructionists avoid syncretic or eclectic approaches that combine practises from different cultures.

Celtic Reconstructionists who follow Gaelic traditions tend to celebrate  at the time of "first fruits", or on the full moon nearest this time. In the Northeastern United States, this is often the time of the blueberry harvest, while in the Pacific Northwest the blackberries are often the festival fruit. In Celtic Reconstructionism,  is seen as a time to give thanks to the spirits and deities for the beginning of the harvest season, and to propitiate them with offerings and prayers not to harm the still-ripening crops. The god  is honoured by many at this time, and gentle rain on the day of the festival is seen as his presence and his bestowing of blessings.

Wicca
Wiccans use the names "Lughnasadh" or "Lammas" for the first of their autumn harvest festivals. It is one of the eight yearly "Sabbats" of their Wheel of the Year, following Midsummer and preceding Mabon. It is seen as one of the two most auspicious times for handfasting, the other being at Beltane. Some Wiccans mark the holiday by baking a figure of the "corn god" in bread, and then symbolically sacrificing and eating it.

See also

General
 Irish mythology in popular culture
 Holidays in Wales
 Aonach

Calendars
 Celtic calendar
 Coligny calendar
 Gaelic calendar
 Wheel of the Year

Holidays
 Samhain
 Imbolc
 Beltane

References

Further reading
 
 
 
 
 
 

August observances
Cross-quarter days
Gaelic culture
Irish mythology
Scottish mythology
Modern pagan holidays
Irish culture
Manx culture
Scottish culture
Holidays in Scotland
Lugh